Sport Clube dos Portos de Bissau is a Guinea-Bissauan football club based in Guinea-Bissau. They play in the Campeonato Nacional da Guine-Bissau.

Achievements
Taça Nacional da Guiné Bissau: 3
 1993, 1998, 2006

References

External links

Football clubs in Guinea-Bissau
Sport in Bissau